Cyperus multifolius is a species of sedge that is native to Central America and northern South America.

The species was first formally described by the botanist Carl Sigismund Kunth in 1837.

See also
List of Cyperus species

References

multifolius
Plants described in 1837
Taxa named by Carl Sigismund Kunth
Flora of Ecuador
Flora of Panama